Jungblut is a surname. Notable people with the surname include:

 Brett Jungblut, professional poker player
 Tanumafili Jungblut (born 1990), Olympic weightlifter
 Viviane Jungblut (born 1996), swimmer

See also
 Youngblood (disambiguation)

German-language surnames